Durant Clifford "Dante" Parkin (20 February 1873 – 20 March 1936) was a South African cricketer who played in one Test match in 1892.

In 1890–91 Parkin took 4 for 69 and 6 for 25 when Eastern Province narrowly beat Griqualand West in the Champion Bat Tournament. In 1891–92 he took seven wickets (match figures of 74–36–59–7, five-ball overs) and five catches when the Eastern Province XVIII lost to Walter Read's English touring team. Three weeks later he was one of eight South Africans who made their Test debuts in the only Test played on the tour. He opened the bowling and took the first three wickets to reduce England to 33 for 3 in reply to South Africa's first innings of 97, but the English lower order rallied and England went on to win by an innings.

Parkin toured England with South Africa's first touring team in 1894, when no first-class matches were played, but was unsuccessful. He played for Griqualand West in the 1902–03 season.

References

External links
 

1873 births
1936 deaths
South Africa Test cricketers
South African cricketers
Cricketers from Port Elizabeth
Eastern Province cricketers
Griqualand West cricketers
Gauteng cricketers